The acronym RSDS may refer to:

 Reflex Sympathetic Dystrophy Syndrome, the old name of the type I variation of the Complex regional pain syndrome.
 Reduced Swing Differential Signaling, an electronic signaling standard and protocol for a chip-to-chip interface.